Orgov is a village in the Ashtarak Municipality of the Aragatsotn Province of Armenia. Orgov is home to the Orgov Radio-Optical Telescope and remains of a Bronze Age fort.

References 

Report of the results of the 2001 Armenian Census

Populated places in Aragatsotn Province